Bernd Wunderlich may refer to:
 Bernd Wunderlich (figure skater), 1975 gold medalist in the East German Figure Skating Championships
 Bernd Wunderlich (footballer) (born 1957), East German international footballer